A raw material is the basic material from which goods, finished products or intermediate materials are manufactured or made.

Raw material may also refer to:
Raw Material (album), 2000 Mars Ill album
Raw Material (Uprok), 2002  Mars Ill album
Raw Materials, 2006 Vijay Iyer album